Ravnace is a settlement in the southern foothills of the Gorjanci range in the Municipality of Metlika in the White Carniola area of southeastern Slovenia. It is part of the traditional region of Lower Carniola and is now included in the Southeast Slovenia Statistical Region.

References

External links

Ravnace on Geopedia

Populated places in the Municipality of Metlika